The 2011 Algerian Cup Final was  the final of the 47th edition of the Algerian Cup. The game was held on May 1, 2011 at the Stade 5 Juillet 1962 in Algiers between USM El Harrach and JS Kabylie. JS Kabylie won the game 1-0 with a goal from Farès Hamiti in the 13th minute of the game. It was JS Kabylie's fifth time winning the Algerian Cup.

Background
Prior to the 2011 final, JS Kabylie had reached the final of the Algerian Cup eight times, winning four of them. The last time the club had reached the final was in 2004, where they lost to USM Alger in penalties. The last time they won the trophy was in 1994, where they beat AS Ain M'lila 1-0 in the final with a goal from Tarek Hadj Adlane. On the other hand, USM El Harrach reached the final of the Algerian Cup just twice prior to the 2011 final, winning on both occasions. The last time they won was in 1987, where they beat JS Bordj Ménaïel 1-0 in the final.

During the season, the two teams had met just once prior to the Algerian Cup final, with USM El Harrach winning the game 1-0 at home with a goal from Mohamed Boualem.

Route to the final

Match details

MATCH OFFICIALS
Assistant referees:
Abdelhak Etchiali
Mohamed Mounir Bitam
Fourth official:
Boulfelfel

See also
 2010–11 Algerian Cup
 Algerian Cup

References

Algerian Cup
Algerian Cup Finals